Aurelio París Sanz de Santamaría (29 August 1870 – 21 January 1924) was a Colombian businessman and entrepreneur.

Early life 
Aurelio París was born on 29 August 1870, born in Bogota, Gran Colombia. His father was Mariano Paris Ricaurte.

1829 births
1899 deaths
People from Bogotá
20th-century Colombian businesspeople

Burials at the Primatial Cathedral of Bogotá
19th-century Roman Catholics
Colombian Roman Catholics